Barekamutyun is a Yerevan Metro station. It is one of the original metro stations in the city of Yerevan and was opened to the public on 7 March 1981.

References

Yerevan Metro stations
Railway stations opened in 1981
1981 establishments in Armenia